Bruce Alan Campbell (born April 22, 1957) is an American actor. He is best known for his roles as Derek Mitchell in the 1987–1992 CBS series Jake and the Fatman and as E.Z. Taylor on the short-lived 1984–1985 Three's Company spin-off Three's a Crowd.

Early life and education
Campbell was born Bruce Alan Campbell on April 22, 1957 in Homestead, Florida, the son of Edward John Campbell, a farmer, and Audrey Carolyn Griner (1930–2015), a homemaker. Campbell attended Tulane University and graduated with a BA in business from the University of Miami.

Career
On television, Campbell became known to viewers when he co-starred with John Ritter on the short-lived Three's Company spin-off Three's a Crowd (1984–1985) in which he played the comedic role of E.Z. Taylor, Jack Tripper's "surfer dude" assistant chef at his bistro. He also co-starred for five seasons with William Conrad and Joe Penny as Assistant District Attorney Derek Mitchell on the CBS crime drama Jake and the Fatman (1987–1992). Campbell has guest starred on numerous television shows including The Facts of Life, Matlock, All My Children, Law & Order, Law & Order: SVU, Homicide: Life on the Street, as well as the web series, Submissions Only and Then We Got Help!.

Campbell was also an established stage actor having appeared on Broadway, Off-Broadway and regional theater. In 1994, he made his Broadway debut in the New York premiere of Andrew Lloyd Webber's musical Sunset Boulevard starring opposite Glenn Close and Alice Ripley, and received a Best Actor in a Musical Tony Award nomination for his performance as Joe Gillis, a role he reprised from the musical's 1993 US premiere in Los Angeles starring opposite Close, again, and Judy Kuhn. He also starred in Susan Stroman's 2000 Tony Award-winning musical Contact at the Vivian Beaumont Theater, Lincoln Center, and its final performance was broadcast by PBS as part of its Live from Lincoln Center series on September 1, 2002. His most current Broadway role was playing Sam Carmichael in the hit musical Mamma Mia! from 2014 until production ceased in September 2015.

His Off-Broadway credits include Adrift In Macao, Book of Days, Avow and Hello Again. He has appeared in several regional theatrical productions of Race, Death and the Maiden, 12 Angry Men, Hay Fever, Of Thee I Sing, Oleanna, Beauty and the Beast, Johnny Guitar, Bells Are Ringing, On Shiloh Hill, Boogie Woogie Rumble of a Dream Deferred and Breakfast at Tiffany's, and productions of I Love My Wife and The Nerd.

Personal life
Campbell was married to actress Nova Ball from 1987 to 1990. On October 10, 1999, he married actress Lauren Kennedy, with whom he appeared in Sunset Boulevard on Broadway. They are divorced and have one child, Riley Rose Campbell.

On April 24, 2008, Campbell and Kennedy opened the Lauren Kennedy and Alan Campbell Theater, which establishes a home for a burgeoning theater program at Barton College, a small liberal arts school in Wilson, North Carolina.

Filmography

Film

Television

Theatre

Broadway

Off-Broadway

Regional

References

External links
 
 
 
  (archive)

1957 births
20th-century American male actors
21st-century American male actors
Actors from Raleigh, North Carolina
American male film actors
American male stage actors
American male television actors
Living people
Male actors from Florida
People from Homestead, Florida
Tulane University alumni
University of Miami Business School alumni